Vernio is a comune (municipality) in the Province of Prato in the Italian region Tuscany, located about  northwest of Florence and about  north of Prato.

History 
Vernio's name derives from that of an ancient Roman winter camp (castra hiberna) located here. A Roman bridge existed in the area, but was destroyed during World War II.

In the 12th century it went from the Carolingians to the counts Alberti from Prato, who lived here after 1107. In the 13th century it went to the Bardi family, as the seat of a county which remained independent until 1798, when it was abolished by Napoleon. After the Congress of Vienna it was annexed to the Grand Duchy of Tuscany.

On June 7, 1944, an American B-25J mitchell bomber was shot down by German anti-aircraft fire over the hills of Vernio. With four 1,000 pound bombs on board, the plane erupted and crashed in the Carbonale woods, in Poggiole, Vernio. Six of the seven men on board perished. The sole survivor parachuted out of the plane and hid in the mountains before making it back to allied lines in Florence three months later. The fallen crew were buried in the cemetery in Montepiano shortly after the crash, their final resting place at Fort Sam Houston, Texas, USA.

In the winter of 2013, the pilot's military tag was found in the woods, and brought to the local museum. The museum hosts an exhibit of the B-25J mitchell consisting of parts of the plane found through metal detecting and also donated by locals. A monument at the crash site was built by the museum and unveiled at the 70th anniversary memorial event on June 7, 2014.  A book was written about the crew and events surrounding the incident, presented at the city hall in downtown Vernio also on the 70th anniversary.

Geography
Vernio borders the following municipalities: Barberino di Mugello, Camugnano, Cantagallo, Castiglione dei Pepoli.

The municipality of Vernio is a union of three villages:
San Quirico (with the town hall)
Mercatale with the Vernio-Cantagallo-Montepiano train station
Sant 'Ippolito (with a nice parish church)

Villages
Cavarzano
Celle di Vernio
Ceraio
Costozze
Gavazzoli
Gorandaccio
La Rocca di Vernio
La Storaia
La Valle di Vernio
Le Confina
Luciana di Verrio
Mercatale di Vernio
Montepiano
Poggiole
San Quirico di Vernio
Sant'Ippolito di Vernio
Sasseta
Segalari
Terrigoli

Main sights
The main sight is the Abbey of Santa Maria (11th century), at Montepiano, housing 13th-century frescoes.

Churches
Sant'Agata chapel in La Rocca
Former oratory of the Company of Jesus in Sant'Ippolito
Madonna della Neve in Sasseta
San Pietro in Cavarzano
Sanctuary of Sant'Antonio Maria Pucci
San Bartolomeo in Costozze
San Martino in Luciana
San Michele in Sasseta
San Niccolò oratory in San Quirico
San Quirico e Leonardo in San Quirico
Sant'Antonio da Padova in Mercatale
Sant'Ippolito e Cassiano in Sant'Ippolito
Santa Maria in Montepiano

Nature
La Torricella
Alpe di Cavarzano

Feasts
Carnevalino (Carnival) in Sant'Ippolito, the Saturday immediately after Ash Wednesday. A traditional plate (pasta with tuna sauce) is served to the participants, accompanied with herrings.
Festa della polenta (polenta feast), also called Pulendina, at San Quirico, the first Sunday of Lent: it remembers an episode happened during the 16th century, when the county of Vernio was hit by a famine, after which the Bardi counts ordered an extraordinary distribution of sweet polenta (made by chestnut flour), herrings and cods to the people.
Fiera di San Giuseppe (St. Joseph Fair) at San Quirico, on 19th March or the weekend immediately after this date.
Montepiano Country, July
Madonna delle Neve feast in Sasseta, 5th August.
Rificolona feast in Montepiano, August

Twin towns
 Senones, France
 Jettingen, Germany
 Marchin, Belgium

References

External links

 

Cities and towns in Tuscany